This is a list of application software written using the Electron software framework to provide the graphical user interface.



List

References 

Free and open-source software
GitHub
Microsoft free software
Software using the MIT license
2013 software
Google Chrome
Cross-platform software
Cross-platform desktop-apps development